The R115 road is a regional road in counties Dublin and Wicklow in Ireland. It follows the Military Road for its entire length.

The Military Road runs north–south across the spine of the Wicklow Mountains. It was constructed between 12 August 1800 and October 1809, in the wake of the Irish Rebellion of 1798, to open up the mountains to British forces to assist them in tracking down United Irishmen insurgents who were hiding there. Rathfarnham itself was the scene of some skirmishes in the early days of the rising.

It was one of the first purpose-built roads in Ireland, excepting turnpikes. Four barracks were built along the way at Glencree, Laragh, Glenmalure, and Aghavannagh.  The engineer in charge was Alexander Taylor (b. 1746), who was responsible for many other roads in the country, including some turnpike roads (toll roads).

Route 
The official definition of the R115 from the Roads Act 1993 (Classification of Regional Roads) Order 2012  reads:

R115: Rathfarnham, County Dublin - Laragh, County Wicklow

Between its junction with R114 at Butterfield Avenue Rathfarnham in the county of South Dublin and its junction with R755 at Laragh in the county of Wicklow via Grange Road, Willbrook Road, Ballyboden Road, Scholarstown Road, Stocking Lane and Military Road in the county of South Dublin: Glencree, Liffey Head Bridge, Sally Gap and Drummin in the county of Wicklow.

Description
The R115 / Military Road starts in Rathfarnham, County Dublin, outside the Yellow House pub and continues to the Ballyboden roundabout, where it intersects with the R113; it then follows the Edmondstown Road for 100 metres where it meets the R116. At this point the route takes the Scholarstown Road and turns left onto Stocking Lane where it rises through the Dublin Mountains (past the Hell Fire Club), followed by a descent into Glencree at the head of the valley of the Glencree river, with a spur down that valley to Enniskerry, before rising again to the vicinity of the entrance gate/road to the TV mast at Kippure (this part of the Military Road is the highest paved public road in Ireland at 523 m).  It descends slightly to the Sally Gap Crossroads (elevation 495 m)(), where it intersects with the R759 road.  From there it continues to a point east of Mullaghcleevaun Mountain (850 m) before descending to the village of Laragh, near Glendalough, via the scenic Glenmacnass waterfall.

The R115 terminates at Laragh, at a junction with the R755 and the 'Wicklow Gap' road, the R756.  The Military Road continues south past Glenmalure to Aghavannagh in south County Wicklow, but is designated as a local road south of Laragh.
 
For many years, the road was used as the Sally Gap special stage in the Circuit of Ireland car rally.

The road was upgraded from the Dublin border to Sally Gap in 1942, by the 3rd battalion of the Construction Corps, to allow for the harvesting of peat and for post-war tourists. The route from Sally Gap to Laragh was apparently overgrown during this period but upgraded in 1956, along with the addition of a car park at Glenmacnass Waterfall.

See also
Wicklow Round
Roads in Ireland
Motorways in Ireland
National primary road
National secondary road
Rathfarnham and the Military Road
Ireland's first ski rescue

Further reading
</ref>

References

External links 
Sally Gap
 The Military Road
 Map of R115 route
Map of Military Road. From A to B is R115 section. A to C is Military Road.

Regional roads in the Republic of Ireland
Roads in County Dublin
Roads in County Wicklow
Military roads